Rodrigo Miguel Reis Parreira (born 16 March 1993) is a Portuguese footballer who plays as a winger for Sintrense. He played in the 2014–15 Segunda Liga for Atlético CP.

References

External links

1993 births
Living people
People from Sintra
Portuguese footballers
Association football wingers
C.F. Os Belenenses players
S.U. Sintrense players
Atlético Clube de Portugal players
S.C. Olhanense players
Liga Portugal 2 players
Sportspeople from Lisbon District